Hartgill is a surname. Notable people with the surname include:

Edward Hartgill, High Sheriff of Wiltshire
George Hartgill, English astronomer